Hukumat is a 1987 Indian Hindi-language action film directed by Anil Sharma, starring Dharmendra and Rati Agnihotri, while Swapna and Sadashiv Amrapurkar play supporting roles. The movie became the second highest-grossing Bollywood film of 1987 and it became "Super-hit" at box office, but surpassed by Mr. India. It also received highly positive response from critics and audiences alike. Also, Dharmendra gave 8 successful movies in the same year, which still remains a record. It was remade in Tamil as Puthiya Vaanam

Plot
Arjun Singh (Dharmendra) is a dare-devil upright cop who believes in dealing strongly with criminals. D.I.G. Khan (Shammi Kapoor) does not agree with his ways and there is always a disagreement between the two. Arjun is sent on a special mission to Shanti Nagar, which in under the police scanner due to some shady activities going on there.  On reaching Shanti Nagar, Arjun sees that it is ruled by a wealthy businessman, Deen Bandhu Deena Nath aka D.B.D.N., who has very high contacts.  He has terrorised the town with the help of his convoy of uniformed men who kill the citizens at will. Arjun realises that D.B.D.N is none other than Mangal Singh (Sadashiv Amrapurkar), the corrupt police officer who had killed Shankardayal Singh, Arjun's father (Parikshit Sahni) when Arjun was a child.  Arjun gets thirsty for D.B.D.N's blood, but is stopped by D.I.G Khan. But when D.B.D.N kills Arjun's young son (Jugal Hansraj), Arjun, with the help of D.I.G Khan sets out to overturn the evil rule (Hukumat) of D.B.D.N

Cast

Soundtrack
Music for the film was scored by the duo of Laxmikant–Pyarelal.
All lyrics are by Verma Malik.

References

External links 
 

1987 films
1980s Hindi-language films
Films scored by Laxmikant–Pyarelal
Hindi films remade in other languages
Indian films about revenge
Fictional portrayals of the Maharashtra Police
Films directed by Anil Sharma